Julius Wolff may refer to:

 Julius Wolff (mathematician) (1882–1945), Dutch mathematician
 Julius Wolff (politician) (1818–1879), American politician
 Julius Wolff (surgeon) (1836–1902), German surgeon
 Julius Wolff (writer) (1834–1910), German writer